Aporodes is a genus of moths of the family Crambidae described by Achille Guenée in 1854.

Species
Aporodes dentifascialis Christoph in Romanoff, 1887
Aporodes floralis (Hübner, 1809)
Aporodes pygmaealis Amsel, 1961

References

Odontiini
Crambidae genera
Taxa named by Achille Guenée
Taxa described in 1854